was a Japanese career officer in the Imperial Japanese Army, who became the 9th head of the  line of shinnōke cadet branches of the Imperial Family of Japan on September 9, 1871.

Early life
Prince Arisugawa Taruhito was born in Kyoto in 1835, as the son of Prince Arisugawa Takahito by Yūko (d. 1841), the eldest daughter of Saeki Yūjō. He was adopted by Emperor Ninkō as a potential heir to the throne, thus making Taruhito the adopted brother of Osahito Shinnō (the future Emperor Kōmei). Arisugawa was a close advisor to both Emperor Kōmei and his nephew by adoption, Emperor Meiji.

Prince Arisugawa became engaged to Princess Kazu-no-Miya Chikako, the eighth daughter of Emperor Ninkō, on August 8, 1861. However, the engagement was cancelled by the Tokugawa bakufu so that the princess could marry the shōgun Tokugawa Iemochi, thus politically sealing the reconciliation between the Shogunate and the Imperial Court.
 
Arisugawa's first wife Sadako (1850–1872) was the eleventh daughter of Tokugawa Nariaki, daimyō of Mito Domain. His second wife was Tadako (1855–1923), daughter of Count Mizoguchi Naohiro, the former daimyō of Shibata Domain. Neither of these marriages produced any children.

Meiji Restoration
In 1867 Emperor Meiji appointed Prince Arisugawa Sōsai (a title equivalent to chief minister), and placed him in command of the Imperial Army sent to combat the last partisans of the Tokugawa bakufu in the Boshin War of 1868–1869. He fought at the Battle of Toba–Fushimi and later travelled up the Tōkaidō, to accept the surrender of Edo Castle on May 3, 1867, from his ex-fiancée Princess Kazu. Prince Arisugawa later led the central government army against the forces of Saigō Takamori in the Satsuma Rebellion of 1877. He was given the honorary rank of general in 1878.

From 1870 until the adoption of the Cabinet system in 1885, Arisugawa served as Daijō-daijin or lord president of the Council of State. In 1871 he was appointed governor of Fukuoka. From 1876 he was the chairman of the Genrōin. In 1882 he travelled to St. Petersburg, Russia, and met with Tsar Alexander III as the official envoy from Emperor Meiji.

From 1889 to 1895 the prince served as chief of staff of the Imperial Japanese Army and a member of the Supreme War Council. 

In 1894 Prince Arisugawa was officially commander-in-chief of Japanese forces in the First Sino-Japanese War, and established his command center at the Hiroshima garrison. He contracted typhoid fever (or possibly malaria) and returned to the Arisugawa palace at Maiko near Kobe to recover, but he died there on January 15, 1895. On his death, Emperor Meiji awarded him the first ever Collar of the Supreme Order of the Chrysanthemum. He was accorded a state funeral in Tokyo on January 29, 1895. His half-brother, Prince Arisugawa Takehito, succeeded as the tenth head of the house of Arisugawa-no-miya.

Legacy
The Arisugawa Memorial Park in Minami-Azabu, Minato, Tokyo occupies the site of the Arisugawa palace and its extensive gardens are open to the public. Although Imperial Prince Taruhito had intended to spend his last days in this palace, he died without ever occupying it. With donations by Ōyama Iwao, Saigō Tsugumichi and Yamagata Aritomo, a statue of the prince on horseback was made and erected in 1903 by the gate of the Imperial Japanese Army General Staff headquarters; it was moved to this park in 1962.

Notes

References

Notes

External links

 Genealogy of the Arisugawa family
 Bio at Tokyo Minato-ku government site

1835 births
1895 deaths
Arisugawa-no-miya
Japanese princes
Meiji Restoration
People of Meiji-period Japan
People of the Boshin War
Japanese military personnel of the First Sino-Japanese War
Japanese generals
People from Kyoto Prefecture
People of the Satsuma Rebellion
Recipients of the Order of the Netherlands Lion
Grand Crosses of the Order of Saint Stephen of Hungary